Polytomella parva is a species of colorless green algae of the genus Polytomella. It lacks a cell wall and contains two linear mitochondrial units of DNA.

References

External links

Chlamydomonadales